Arno Aleksander Saarinen (11 September 1884 – 7 February 1970) was a Finnish gymnast who won bronze in the 1908 Summer Olympics.

Gymnastics 

He won the Finnish national championship in team gymnastics as a member of Ylioppilasvoimistelijat in 1909.

Biography 

His parents were Gustaf Adolf Saarinen and Gustafva Lindborg. He married Varma Väiniö in 1928. They had three children:
 Antti Sakari (1920–)
 Taru Kirsti Kaarina (1933–)
 Ilkka Aarnio Kalevi (1935–)

He completed his matriculation exam in Vaasa Finnish real lyceum in 1903. He graduated as a Master of Science in 1909. He worked in various engineering jobs in 1909–1915. Then he was an assistant manager at a SOK production plant in 1916–1949. Finally he was a salesman in 1950–1964.

He completed engineer officer examination in 1928, and reached the rank of captain (eng.).

Source

References 

1884 births
1970 deaths
Finnish male artistic gymnasts
Gymnasts at the 1908 Summer Olympics
Olympic gymnasts of Finland
Olympic bronze medalists for Finland
Olympic medalists in gymnastics

Medalists at the 1908 Summer Olympics
20th-century Finnish people